The magistrate of Taitung is the chief executive of the government of Taitung County. This list includes directly elected magistrates of the county. The incumbent Magistrate is Rao Ching-ling of Kuomintang since 25 December 2018.

Directly elected County Magistrates

Timeline

See also
 Taitung County Government

References

External links
 Magistrates - Taitung County Government 
 

Taitung County